Margaret Lake is located in Glacier National Park, in the U. S. state of Montana. Margaret Lake is fed by Pyramid Creek as well as melt waters from Chaney Glacier. The lake has a maximum length of 0.8 km (0.5 mi)  and width of  0.32 km (0.2 mi).

See also
List of lakes in Glacier County, Montana

References

Lakes of Glacier National Park (U.S.)
Lakes of Glacier County, Montana